Robert Strachan (1913–1981) was a Canadian unionist and politician.

Robert Strachan may also refer to:

Bob Strachan (footballer, born 1886) (1886–1927), Australian rules footballer for Collingwood
Bob Strachan (footballer, born 1944), Australian rules footballer for South Melbourne
Robert Kenneth Strachan (1910–1965), missionary
Robert Harold Lundie  Strachan, (1925-2010), South African writer and anti-apartheid activist known as Jock Strachan